In BDSM, service-oriented submission (or sometimes servitude) is the performance of personal tasks for a dominant partner, as part of a submissive role in a BDSM relationship. The submissive is sometimes said to be in service to the dominant. Service-oriented submission is part of a spectrum of submissive behaviors, and not all submissives are service-oriented.

In domestic service roles, the submissive can receive pleasure and satisfaction from performing services for their dominant, such as serving as a butler, waitress, chauffeur, maid or housekeeper. Many derive satisfaction from being focused on the needs of another, rather than themselves.

Service-oriented submission can be performed in ways that are either servile, or dignified. Bootblacking is a service-oriented task performed within the leather subculture.

Bootblacking may sometimes involve boot-licking as part of the activity.

The satisfaction of service submission is often combined with the pleasures of fetishes, the pleasures of humiliation, or both. A submissive may rub his or her dominant's feet because the sub enjoys providing the service, has a foot fetish, enjoys being "lower" than the dominant, or any combination.

See also
Erotic humiliation
Financial domination
Master/slave (BDSM)
Service top
Sexual roleplay
Top, bottom, switch (BDSM)

References

BDSM terminology